Mathieu Roy (born August 10, 1983) is a Canadian professional ice hockey defenceman who is currently under contract with Ligue Magnus (FRA) outfit, Dragons de Rouen.

Playing career
Roy was drafted in the seventh round of the 2003 NHL Entry Draft, 215th overall, by the Edmonton Oilers. Most of Roy's professional career has been spent in the American Hockey League, with the Toronto and Edmonton Roadrunners, and the Hamilton Bulldogs, although he has also spent time in the NHL with the Edmonton Oilers.

In the 2006–07 season, on January 10, 2007, while on a recall to the Oilers, Roy scored his first NHL goal against the San Jose Sharks.

On November 2, 2007, after only a few minutes into a game, Roy was checked into the boards by Nashville Predators forward Jordin Tootoo, forcing Roy to leave the game with a shoulder injury.

On July 14, 2009, Roy signed a one-year, two-way contract with the Columbus Blue Jackets. In the 2009–10 season, Roy appeared in 31 games with the Blue Jackets, recording a career-high 10 assists before he was traded to the Florida Panthers for Matt Rust on March 3, 2010.

The following season, Roy was signed by the Tampa Bay Lightning and was assigned to AHL affiliate, the Norfolk Admirals to begin the 2010–11 season. Roy registered 22 points in 45 games with the Admirals and was recalled to play in 4 games with the Lighting during the season as a depth defenseman.

A free agent, Roy signed with South East Division rivals the Carolina Hurricanes to a one-year contract on September 14, 2011. Roy failed to make his debut with the Hurricanes, assigned to affiliate the Charlotte Checkers for the duration of the 2011–12 season.

With free agency once again in procession and the impending 2012 NHL lockout, Roy signed his first European contract with the Hamburg Freezers of the Deutsche Eishockey Liga on July 12, 2012. During a successful debut season with the Freezers, Roy was signed to a contract extension on January 3, 2013, that would keep him with the Hamburg team until the end of the 2014-15 campaign. He finished the 2012–13 season, with 26 points in 51 games.

Upon elimination from the Playoffs with the Freezers, Roy returned to North America for the off-season. On April 23, 2013, with his previous NHL club, the Tampa Bay Lightning, suffering from a depleted blueline, Roy was signed to a contract for the final game of the Lightning's 2013 season, before returning to Hamburg for the 2013–14 season. In March 2015, he inked a new two-year deal with the Hamburg Freezers. In May 2016, his Hamburg stint ended prematurely as the organization folded. Roy had spent a total of four years with the Freezers.

He signed with EC Red Bull Salzburg of the Austrian Hockey League (EBEL) on July 18, 2016.

Career statistics

References

External links 
 
 

1983 births
Canadian ice hockey defencemen
Charlotte Checkers (2010–) players
Columbus Blue Jackets players
Columbus Cottonmouths (ECHL) players
Dragons de Rouen players
Edmonton Oilers draft picks
Edmonton Road Runners players
Hamburg Freezers players
Hamilton Bulldogs (AHL) players
Ice hockey people from Quebec
Living people
Norfolk Admirals players
People from Saint-Georges, Quebec
Rochester Americans players
EC Red Bull Salzburg players
Springfield Falcons players
Syracuse Crunch players
Tampa Bay Lightning players
Toronto Roadrunners players
Val-d'Or Foreurs players
Canadian expatriate ice hockey players in Austria
Canadian expatriate ice hockey players in Germany